Alexandra Štuková (born 2 July 1990) is a Slovak middle-distance runner. She competed in the 800 metres at the 2016 European Athletics Championships.

References

External links
 

1990 births
Living people
Slovak female middle-distance runners
Place of birth missing (living people)
Athletes (track and field) at the 2015 European Games
Athletes (track and field) at the 2019 European Games
European Games medalists in athletics
European Games silver medalists for Slovakia